Clay Kaytis (born March 22, 1973) is an American animator and film director, best known for directing the animated film The Angry Birds Movie and the Christmas comedy film The Christmas Chronicles.

Career 
Kaytis started his career as an animator at the Walt Disney Animation Studios. His main credits at Disney included Tangled, Wreck-It Ralph, and Frozen. After working nineteen years, he left the studio in 2013.

Kaytis made his directing debut with The Angry Birds Movie, which he co-directed with Fergal Reilly for Sony Pictures Entertainment. The film was based on the Rovio Entertainment's video game Angry Birds. Jon Vitti wrote the screenplay for the film, which was released on May 20, 2016. Kaytis then made his live-action directing debut with The Christmas Chronicles for Netflix, which was released on November 22, 2018.

In late September 2016, it was announced that Kaytis will direct The Lunch Witch for Amblin Partners.

On January 20, 2022, it was announced that Kaytis will direct a sequel to the 1983 film A Christmas Story entitled A Christmas Story Christmas for Warner Bros. Pictures and Legendary Pictures to be released on HBO Max, with Peter Billingsley reprising his role as Ralphie as an adult and Vince Vaughn serving as producer.

Filmography

References

External links 
 

Living people
American animators
American animated film directors
Film directors from California
Walt Disney Animation Studios people
1973 births